Joanna Blair (born 1 March 1986) is a British javelin thrower who won the javelin event at the 2016 British Athletics Championships and England Athletics Championships, came second in the events at the 2004 Commonwealth Youth Games, 2006 AAA Championships and 2017 British Athletics Championships, and came third at the 2014 British Athletics Championships.

Career
Blair trained at Luton Athletics Club, and also worked as a sports masseuse. In 2003, she won the English Schools Senior Championship javelin event. She came second in the javelin event at the 2004 Commonwealth Youth Games, behind Australian Annabel Thomson. Blair competed at the 2005 European Athletics Junior Championships. She came second in the 2006 AAA Championships. She came seventh in the 2010 South of England Championships, with a best throw of 42.20m.

Blair came third in the javelin event at the 2014 British Athletics Championships. She won the javelin event at the 2016 British Athletics Championships, in a personal best distance of 57.44m, more than three metres better than her previous best. It was the seventh best throw ever by a British female javelin thrower. Later in the year, she won the England Athletics Championships with a best throw of 52.63m, and she was named Luton's female sportsperson of the year.

In 2017, she competed at the Nitro Athletics team event in Australia. She failed to qualify for the 2017 World Championships in Athletics in London; the qualifying distance was 61.50 metres. She came second at the 2017 trial event for the 2018 Commonwealth Games in Australia, and was considered a contender for a place at the Games. She came second to Laura Whittingham at the 2017 British Athletics Championships. Blair competed at the 2017 European Team Championships. It was her first international event for 11 years, and she finished ninth. At the event, she failed an out of competition drugs test, after testing positive for anabolic steroid metandienone. She was suspended by UK Anti-Doping (UKAD), who said they believed she had received a "contaminated supplement", and Blair blamed contaminated creatine that she bought on the internet. In 2018, she was given a backdated four year suspension until July 2021.

References

1986 births
Living people
English female javelin throwers
British Athletics Championships winners
Doping cases in athletics